Sky Pirates! is an original novel written by Dave Stone and based on the long-running British science fiction television series Doctor Who. It features the Seventh Doctor, Bernice, Chris and Roz. The novel was unusual for being written in a humorous style similar to that of Terry Pratchett and Douglas Adams.

Synopsis
The Doctor and Benny travel on the ship Schirron Dream. They confront various hostile climates, bizarre crew members and an alien race threatening the entirety of the local star system.

1995 British novels
1995 science fiction novels
Virgin New Adventures
British science fiction novels
Novels by Dave Stone
Seventh Doctor novels